Mother Goose is a ballet made for New York City Ballet's Ravel Festival by balletmaster Jerome Robbins to Ravel's music and scenario, the Ma Mère l'Oye Suite from 1908, orchestrated by the composer in 1912. The premiere took place on May 22, 1975, at the New York State Theater, Lincoln Center, with costumes by Stanley Simmons and lighting by Jennifer Tipton. At its premiere it bore the French title, which was retained when it was first revived in January 1978 but anglicized by May of that year.
Ma Mère l'Oye was written as a suite of five pieces for piano four hands and later orchestrated and adapted into a ballet, by M. Ravel, with the addition of a prelude, an opening scene and four interludes connecting the five original pieces.

Cast

Original 

   
Muriel Aasen
Delia Peters
Tracy Bennett
Deborah Koolish
Colleen Neary
 
Richard Hoskinson
Matthew Giordano
Jay Jolley
Daniel Duell

References 

  
Playbill, NYCB, Thursday, May 15, 2008 
Repertory Week, NYCB, Spring Season, 2008 repertory, week 3

Footnotes

Reviews 

  
NY Times review, Jennifer Dunning, April 29, 1983 
NY Times review, Jack Anderson, January 6, 1983 
NY Times review, Anna Kisselgoff, June 11, 1990 
NY Times review, Jennifer Dunning, June 27, 1991 
NY Times review, Jennifer Dunning, February 15, 1992 
NY Times review, Gia Kourlas, May 17, 2008

Ballets by Maurice Ravel
Ballets by Jerome Robbins
New York City Ballet Ravel Festival
New York City Ballet repertory
1975 ballet premieres
Ballets designed by Jennifer Tipton
Ballets based on fairy tales
Works based on nursery rhymes
Ballets based on works by Charles Perrault